List of Japanese governors-general may refer to:
Governor-General of Korea
Governor-General of Taiwan